Following the 2017 election, Ole Vive from Venstre won the mayor's position after the Social Democrats had held it in the 7 years prior to that election.

Originally Christina Birkemose was elected to be the candidate of the Social Democrats for this election. However internal conflict resulted in her losing the support, and therefore a new candidate was to be chosen. This time it would be Camilla Mayer who won the support from the Social Democrats.

In the election, the Social Democrats would once again become the biggest party. However the blue bloc won 13 seats, and it proved difficult for Camilla Meyer becoming the new mayor. It was eventually confirmed that Ole Vive from Venstre had a majority supporting him to continue as mayor.

Electoral system
For elections to Danish municipalities, a number varying from 9 to 31 are chosen to be elected to the municipal council. The seats are then allocated using the D'Hondt method and a closed list proportional representation.
Faxe Municipality had 25 seats in 2021

Unlike in Danish General Elections, in elections to municipal councils, electoral alliances are allowed.

Electoral alliances  

Electoral Alliance 1

Electoral Alliance 2

Electoral Alliance 3

Results

Notes

References 

Faxe